Justus Frantz (born 18 May 1944 in Inowrocław, Poland, then Hohensalza, Germany) is a German pianist, conductor, and television personality.

Life 

Frantz began playing piano at the age of ten and later studied with Eliza Hansen and Wilhelm Kempff at the Hochschule für Musik und Theater Hamburg under a scholarship from the Studienstiftung des deutschen Volkes, or German National Scholarship Foundation. In 1967, Frantz and Claus Kanngießer won the second prize at the international music competition of the ARD playing as a cello and piano duo, marking the beginning of his international career. He first played with the Berlin Philharmonic Orchestra, conducted by Herbert von Karajan in 1970. In 1975, he played in his United States debut concert with the New York Philharmonic Orchestra conducted by Leonard Bernstein, who became his lifelong friend. Other conductors with whom he has played include Carlo Maria Giulini and Rudolf Kempe. He founded the Schleswig-Holstein Musik Festival in 1986 and became a UNHCR Goodwill Ambassador in 1989, a post from which he has since retired. He also founded the Philharmonia of the Nations in 1995. From September 2013 Maestro Frantz is musical director of The Israel Sinfonietta Beersheba.

Repertoire 

Frantz mostly plays music from the Classical and Romantic periods, particularly by Mozart. He has played many pieces for piano duet or four hands with Christoph Eschenbach.

Controversy 
Frantz came under criticism after justifying the Annexation of Crimea by the Russian Federation in 2014, calling it "making amends for historical wrongdoing" and labeling himself a Putinversteher (Putin sympathizer, literally: "Putin understander"). He repeatedly criticized the sanctions imposed on Russia, referring to Russian President Vladimir Putin as a "cultivated man". In February 2023, Frantz was one of the initial signers of a petition calling for an end to military support to Ukraine in the wake of the 2022 Russian invasion of Ukraine.

Performances (selection)
Festspiele Balver Höhle (1994 - 2007)

External links 

 (Under construction) 
Biography
https://web.archive.org/web/20110719034821/http://archiv.handwerk-special.de/archiv/hw_spec/57_20.htm 
Interview with Justus Frantz, February 20, 1991

References

1944 births
Living people
German male conductors (music)
German pianists
People from Inowrocław
United Nations High Commissioner for Refugees Goodwill Ambassadors
Studienstiftung alumni
Hochschule für Musik und Theater Hamburg alumni
Commanders Crosses of the Order of Merit of the Federal Republic of Germany
21st-century German conductors (music)
21st-century pianists
21st-century German male musicians